The Captive may refer to:

Films
 The Captive (1915 film), a 1915 drama film directed by Cecil B. DeMille
 The Captive, the English title of La Prisonnière, a 1968 film, the final work of French director Henri-Georges Clouzot
 La Captive (The Captive), a 2000 drama film directed by Chantal Akerman
 The Captive (2014 film), a 2014 film directed by Atom Egoyan

Literature
 The Captive (1769 play), a work by the Irish writer Isaac Bickerstaffe
 The Captive, the English title of La Prisonnière, part of In Search of Lost Time, a 1927 novel in seven volumes by Marcel Proust
 The Captive (play), a 1926 English-language adaptation by Arthur Hornblow, Jr. of the play La prisonnière by Édouard Bourdet

Other arts, entertainment, and media
 The Captive (album), an album by former Dispatch member Braddigan
 The Captive (painting), by Joseph Wright of Derby

See also
 Captive (disambiguation)
 Captivity (disambiguation)